Leptobrachium nigrops, also known as the black-eyed litter frog, is a species of amphibian in the family Megophryidae. It is found in Indonesia, Malaysia, and Singapore. Its natural habitats are subtropical or tropical moist lowland forests, subtropical or tropical swamps, and rivers. It is threatened by habitat loss.

References

External links
Amphibian and Reptiles of Peninsular Malaysia - Leptobrachium nigrops

nigrops
Taxonomy articles created by Polbot
Amphibians described in 1963